WCOK (1060 AM) is a radio station broadcasting a religious format during daylight hours. Licensed to Sparta, North Carolina, United States, it serves the Piedmont Triad area.  The station is owned by Gospel Broadcasting Inc.

External links
 official website

COK
COK